John Graham (born November 20, 1965 in Moose Jaw, Saskatchewan) is a retired track and field athlete from Canada, who competed in the 400 metres and in the hurdling events. John Was University of Calgary's Athlete of the Year in 1985 winning the 300m and 600m, 4 × 200 m and 4 × 400 m races at Canada West and the National Collegiate Championships.  In 1989, he won those same events again claiming the Canadian athlete of the meet for the second time.  He represented his Canada on the national team from 1985 to 1991 and the 1988 Summer Olympics in Seoul, South Korea.  John won three bronze medals in the Commonwealth games in 1986 and 1990. Along the way, John captured 11 National Championships and set numerous national records both indoor and outdoors.

John was also a member of the Canadian bobsleigh team.  John was the Brakeman for Canada 1 which won the 1990 World Cup 4-man bobsleigh Championship.  Canada 1 set several push records and won 3 national titles over John's 4 years with Chris Lori as driver.

References
 John Graham at the Canadian Olympic Committee
 John Graham at Sports-Reference.com

1965 births
Living people
Canadian male bobsledders
Canadian male hurdlers
Sportspeople from Moose Jaw
Sportspeople from Saskatchewan
Athletes (track and field) at the 1988 Summer Olympics
Olympic track and field athletes of Canada
Athletes (track and field) at the 1986 Commonwealth Games
Athletes (track and field) at the 1990 Commonwealth Games
Commonwealth Games bronze medallists for Canada
Commonwealth Games medallists in athletics
Athletes (track and field) at the 1987 Pan American Games
Pan American Games track and field athletes for Canada
Medallists at the 1986 Commonwealth Games
Medallists at the 1990 Commonwealth Games